Şişeşti may refer to several places in Romania:

Șișești, Mehedinți, a commune in Mehedinţi County
Șișești, Maramureș, a commune in Maramureș County

and to:

Gheorghe Ionescu-Sisești, agronomer
Nicolae Ionescu-Sisești, neurologist